James Henry Forrester (November 24, 1870 – July 16, 1928) was an American lawyer, judge, and politician.

Biography
Forester was born in Christian County, Illinois. He went to the public schools. In 1893, he graduated from Illinois State University in Normal, Illinois. Forrester then graduated from Wharton School of the University of Pennsylvania in 1895. Forrester was admitted to the Illinois bar in 1897. He practiced law in Decatur, Illinois. In 1898, he moved to Taylorville, Illinois and continued to practice law there until his death. He served as the Christian County Court Judge from 1902 to 1906 and was involved with the Republican Party. Forrester served in the Illinois Senate from 1921 until his death in 1928. Forrester died in his physician's office in Owaneco, Illinois after riding with friends.

References

External links

1870 births
1928 deaths
People from Taylorville, Illinois
Illinois State University alumni
Wharton School of the University of Pennsylvania alumni
Illinois lawyers
Illinois state court judges
Republican Party Illinois state senators
19th-century American lawyers